
Year 865 (DCCCLXV) was a common year starting on Monday (link will display the full calendar) of the Julian calendar.

Events 
 By place 
 Europe 
 King Louis the German divides the East Frankish Kingdom among his three sons. Carloman receives Bavaria (with more lands along the Inn River). He gives Saxony to Louis the Younger (with Franconia, and Thuringia) and Swabia (with Raetia) to Charles the Fat. Louis arranges marriages into the local aristocracy, for his sons to hold important territories along the frontiers.
 King Lothair II, threatened with excommunication, takes back his first wife, Teutberga. She expresses her desire for an annulment, but this is refused by Pope Nicholas I.
 Boris I, ruler (knyaz) of the Bulgarian Empire, suppresses a revolt, and orders the execution of 52 leading boyars, along with their whole families.

 Britain 
 The Great Heathen Army (probably no more than 1,000 men) of Vikings, led by Ivar the Boneless and Halfdan Ragnarsson, invades East Anglia. King Edmund of East Anglia buys peace with a supply of horses.
 Viking king Ragnar Lodbrok is captured by the Northumbrians in battle, and killed by being thrown into a pit filled with poisonous snakes, on the orders of King Ælla of Northumbria.
 Autumn – King Æthelberht of Wessex dies after a 5-year reign, and is buried at Sherborne Abbey (Dorset). He is succeeded by his brother Æthelred I, as ruler of Wessex.

 Abbasid Caliphate 
 Caliphal Civil War: An armed conflict starts between the rival Muslim caliphs al-Musta'in and al-Mu'tazz. They fight to determine who takes control over the Abbasid Caliphate (until 866).

 By topic 
 Religion 
 Kassia, a Byzantine abbess and hymnographer, dies. She is one of the first Early Medieval composers of many hymns.

Births 
 Al-Nayrizi, Persian mathematician (d. 922)
 Baldwin II, Frankish margrave (approximate date)
 Jinseong, queen of Silla (approximate date)
 Lady Ren Neiming, Chinese noblewoman (d. 918)
 Louis III, king of the West Frankish Kingdom (or 863)
 Simeon I, ruler (khan) of the Bulgarian Empire (or 864)

Deaths 
 February 3 – Ansgar, Frankish monk and archbishop (b. 801)
 March 8 – Rudolf of Fulda, German theologian
 November 11 – Petronas, Byzantine general
 December 26 – Zheng, empress of the Tang Dynasty
 Æthelberht, king of Wessex
 Antony the Younger, Byzantine governor and saint (b. 785)
 Deshan Xuanjian, Chinese Zen Buddhist monk
 Gao Qu, chancellor of the Tang Dynasty
 Kassia, Byzantine abbess and hymnographer
 Khurshid, ruler (shah) of Daylam
 Liu Gongquan, Chinese calligrapher (b. 778)
 Lothair the Lame, Frankish abbot
 Muhammad ibn al-Fadl al-Jarjara'i, Muslim vizier (or 864)
 Pepin II, king of Aquitaine (approximate date)
 Ragnar Lodbrok, king of Denmark and Sweden
 Raymond I, count of Toulouse
 Rorgon II, count of Maine (approximate date)
 Tigernach mac Fócartai, king of Lagore (Ireland)
 Wenilo, Frankish archbishop
 Xiao Zhi, chancellor of the Tang Dynasty
 Yahya ibn Umar, Muslim imam (or 864)

References